West Park Hospital (sometimes erroneously referred to as West Park Asylum) was a large psychiatric hospital in Epsom, Surrey.

History

Origins
The hospital seems to have been so-called because of its location to the west of the landscaped parkland formerly associated with Horton Manor (later the Manor Hospital).  Although sometimes called an 'asylum' by urban explorers and the media, West Park was never officially termed as such, having opened as West Park Mental Hospital in 1923. The term had largely fallen out of favour by the 1920s and was made obsolete in law by the Mental Treatment Act 1930.

Design and construction

The hospital was designed by William C. Clifford-Smith (architect to the London County Council), who was also involved in the design of nearby St Ebba's and The Manor Hospitals. The hospital had been in planning since 1906, and by 1917 it was largely complete; however, the outbreak of war postponed opening until 1921. The hospital was the last great London mental hospital, and the last of the Epsom Cluster.

Operation

When complete the hospital could cater for around 2,000 patients of mixed class. The site had extensive boiler houses and plant rooms, a large laundry and a substantial water tower. There were also large kitchens located behind the canteen and a substantial recreation hall or ballroom (the latter suffered an arson attack on 30 September 2003 and is now a burnt out shell). The hospital was also once served by the Horton Estate's own railway but this was removed in 1950 and no trace remains except around the central engineering block.

Decline and redevelopment

The hospital was slowly run down from the mid-1990s, and by 2003 most of the hospital was closed and derelict, although some buildings, including the New Epsom and Ewell Cottage Hospital remain in use by NHS healthcare services. Because of its derelict state, it came to be of interest to urban explorers who were attracted by the sheer size of the buildings and also the many hospital items still in situ, such as beds, kitchen equipment and personal items. A padded cell also remained in-situ and was of considerable interest to explorers.

In November 2010, demolition began of the former hospital buildings. As of April 2011, most of the central buildings had been cleared with only a limited number of wards, the water tower and administration building being retained for conversion to apartments. These were retained in the Noble Park housing development which was completed in April 2012.

Gallery

See also

Horton Light Railway
Epsom Cluster

External links
West Park Gallery
Brief history and photographs of the hospital taken between 2009 and 2010
Additional Photographs from Abandoned Britain

References

Former psychiatric hospitals in England
Hospitals in Surrey
Epsom
Hospital buildings completed in 1923
Demolished buildings and structures in England
Buildings and structures demolished in 2010
Hospitals established in 1923
1923 establishments in England
2003 disestablishments in England
Defunct companies based in Surrey
Defunct hospitals in England